Torill Eidsheim (born 8 April 1970) is a Norwegian politician for the Conservative Party. She was elected to the Parliament of Norway from Hordaland in 2013 where she is member of the Standing Committee on Transport and Communications.

References 

Conservative Party (Norway) politicians
Members of the Storting
Hordaland politicians
1970 births
Living people
21st-century Norwegian politicians